The Gifu Mosque or Bab al-Islam Gifu Mosque is a mosque in Gifu City, Gifu Prefecture, Japan. It is the first mosque in the prefecture.

History
The mosque was established by Nagoya Mosque. The construction started on 25 October 2007 and completed on 30 June 2008 with a total cost of JP¥129 million.

Architecture
The mosque was constructed in a 2-story building with Middle East architectural style in white paint. It has a total area of 351 m2. It also includes a Muslim Culture Center and an Islamic school, which was constructed with a cost of JP¥135 million.

Transportation
The mosque is accessible by bus from Gifu Station.

See also
 Islam in Japan
 List of mosques in Japan

References

2008 establishments in Japan
Buildings and structures in Gifu
Mosques completed in 2008